Cecil Moore was an Irish football (soccer) goalkeeper who earned one cap with both Ireland and the United States.

In 1945, Moore joined Glentoran F.C. where he played for the next six seasons.  He later played for the New York Americans of the American Soccer League.

Moore played one match for Ireland, against Wales on 9 March 1949.  After moving to the United States, he played in a 6-3 United States loss to England on June 8, 1953.

References

External links
 NIFG: Cecil Moore
 

1926 births
Possibly living people
American soccer players
American Soccer League (1933–1983) players
Association football goalkeepers
Dual internationalists (football)
Glentoran F.C. players
New York Americans (soccer) (1933–1956) players
Pre-1950 IFA international footballers
United States men's international soccer players
Association footballers from Belfast